The 2001 Fiji rugby union tour of Italy and France was a series of matches played in November 2001 in Italy and France by Fiji national rugby union team.

Results 
Scores and results list Fiji's points tally first.

References 
 
 
 

Fiji
tour
Fiji national rugby union team tours
tour
tour
Fiji rugby union tour of Italy and France
Rugby union tours of Italy
Rugby union tours of France